The Exceptional Service Medallion (formally known as the Exceptional Service Emblem) is a civilian decoration of the United States government. It is awarded by the Central Intelligence Agency in recognition of "an employee's injury or death resulting from service in a hazardous area."

Recipients 
John Anthony Celli III
John T. Downey
James A. Rawlings
Johnny Micheal Spann

See also 
Awards and decorations of the United States government

References

Awards and decorations of the Central Intelligence Agency